Rotherham West is a ward in the Metropolitan Borough of Rotherham, South Yorkshire, England.  The ward contains nine listed buildings that are recorded in the National Heritage List for England.  All the listed buildings are designated at Grade II, the lowest of the three grades, which is applied to "buildings of national importance and special interest".  The ward is to the west of the centre of Rotherham, and includes the suburb of Kimberworth.  The listed buildings consist of a former manor house and associated structures, a large house used as offices, a mausoleum, a lock on the River Don Navigation, a railway bridge, and a public house.


Buildings

References

Citations

Sources

 

Lists of listed buildings in South Yorkshire
Buildings and structures in Rotherham